Ganyra is a Neotropical genus of butterflies in the family Pieridae.

Species
Ganyra howarthi (Dixey, 1915)
Ganyra josephina (Godart, 1819)
Ganyra phaloe (Godart, 1819)

References

Pierini
Pieridae of South America
Pieridae genera
Taxa named by Gustaf Johan Billberg